The Motloutse River is a river in Botswana, a tributary of the Limpopo River.
The Letsibogo Dam on the Motloutse has been built to serve the industrial town of Selebi-Phikwe and surrounding local areas, with potential for use in irrigation.

Ecology

A field survey of the region in January 1989, before the dam was built, recorded 120 species of birds, mostly small insectivores.
A relatively large number of water birds were found due to the presence of permanent pools on the Motloutse river downstream from its confluence with the Letlhakane river. 
The species of bird were generally typical for the region.
Before the dam was built, five or more pioneer fish species would migrate upstream from the Limpopo River into the Motloutse River during floods.
The Letsibogo dam was expected to support a permanent fish population similar to that of the Shashe Dam.

Water resource

Due to this difference, the river is  an ephemeral sand river with surface flow only during the rainy season.
Rainfall is also highly variable, with rains of under 40% of the average expected one year in seven.

Mineral resources

Gold mining along the Motloutse and Limpopo rivers started around 1200 CE, about the time that Great Zimbabwe rose to become a regional power.
Gold was found in 1860 in the old workings near Francistown, to the north of the river, causing the first small gold rush in Africa.
The first authenticated diamonds to be found in Botswana were three small stones discovered in 1959 by the Central African Selection Trust in gravels in the Motloutse River near Foley Siding.  The team that found the diamonds examined the river up to its headwaters, but found no likely source.
In 2004, geologist Leon Daniels identified a warp in the earth's crust stretching from Bulawayo in Zimbabwe to the south of Botswana.  He speculated that before the warp formed, the Motoutse river could have risen much farther to the west.  Eventually, he found the huge Orapa kimberlite.

References
Citations

Sources

Rivers of Botswana